Melica tenuis, is a species of grass that can be found in Brazil, Paraguay, Uruguay and Argentinian provinces such as Misioines and Entre Rios.

Description
The species is perennial and caespitose with short rhizomes. Leaf-sheaths are closed, scabrous, glabrous and are split. They are also straight and flat with lower surface being rough and glabrous. It upper surface though is striate-hispid with scabrous margins.

The species' rachis is scaorus while it branches are scabrous. It spikelets are obconic and are violet in colour. It also have filiform pedicels which are curved and puberulent. Both first and second florets are bisexual but the second one is hairless.

References

tenuis
Flora of South America